Colin Frank Jackson (6 March 1906 – 7 August 1977) was a former Australian rules footballer who played with Melbourne in the Victorian Football League (VFL).

Notes

External links 

Colin Jackson on Demonwiki

1906 births
Australian rules footballers from Tasmania
Melbourne Football Club players
1977 deaths
City-South Football Club players
Longford Football Club players
Launceston Football Club players